Sam Delich is an Australian actor. 

Delich has appeared in the FX series Mr Inbetween as Yaniv, as well as appearing in the Royal Flying Doctors Service and Home and Away. After appearing in the 2022 Netflix science fiction film Spiderhead, alongside Chris Hemsworth and Miles Teller, Delich was cast in the upcoming Disney+ production Last Days of the Space Age.

Filmography

References

1979 births
Living people
Australian male film actors
Australian male television actors
21st-century Australian male actors